Caine Road Bridge is a covered bridge spanning the west branch of the Ashtabula River in Pierpont Township, Ashtabula County, Ohio, United States. The bridge, built in honor of Ashtabula County's 175th anniversary, and one of currently 17 drivable bridges in the county, is a single span Pratt truss design.

History
1986 – Bridge constructed.

Caine Family History
Thomas Caine and wife his wife Margaret (Quiggen) Caine were born in the Isle of Mann. They emigrated to America in about 1837, settling in Newburg, Ohio, and later moving to Pierpont, where he was a farmer. They had 7 children. Thomas died in 1894, his wife Margaret earlier in 1888. They are buried in nearby Evergreen Cemetery, along with four of their children.

Dimensions
Length: 
Overhead clearance:

See also

List of Ashtabula County covered bridges

References

External links
Ohio Covered Bridges List
Ohio Covered Bridge Homepage
The Covered Bridge Numbering System
Ohio Historic Bridge Association
Caine Road Covered Bridge from Ohio Covered Bridges, Historic Bridges

Covered bridges in Ashtabula County, Ohio
Bridges completed in 1986
Road bridges in Ohio
Wooden bridges in Ohio
Pratt truss bridges in the United States
1986 establishments in Ohio